José Riga (born 30 July 1957) is a Belgian former football player and manager.

Managerial career

Charlton Athletic
Riga was appointed as manager of Charlton Athletic on 11 March 2014, one day after the sacking of Chris Powell, who had been dismissed when he and the club owner were unable to reach agreement over the long-term vision for the club. At the time Charlton were fourth from bottom of the Championship. Riga was appointed the manager with a contract until the end of the 2013–14 season; the main task was to avoid relegation. This was achieved on 29 April 2014 following a 3-1 home win against Watford.

Blackpool
On 3 June 2014 it was reported that Riga had agreed to a deal to become manager of Blackpool, and was set to start the following week. The following day, club chairman Karl Oyston confirmed that there was a verbal agreement in place, and on 11 June he was confirmed as the new manager. Three weeks later, newspaper reports claimed that Riga was unsettled and ready to quit. Whilst the club and Riga did not comment, no coaching staff had been appointed and even though the club had just seven contracted players, no signings had been made. With so few players, no assistant or backroom staff appointed, and the squad due to report back on 30 June, Riga had to delay the start of pre-season training.

On 9 July it was confirmed that, with still just eight players at the club, Riga had three backroom staff, all of whom had agreed to start working the previous week but had still not signed contracts. Two days later it was stated that tensions were high at the club, and between Riga and Oyston. On 17 July, having already cancelled a pre-season trip to Spain to focus on signings, it was claimed that Riga's future was even more uncertain following reports of a dispute with the chairman over transfer policy. Two days later Blackpool played a friendly away against Northern League Division One side Penrith, fielding five triallists in the starting line-up with two more on the substitutes bench and with just six fit registered players, the rest of the match day squad was made up of youth team players. Riga was given a standing ovation by the Blackpool fans. Then after the match it was reported that when the media requested to speak with Riga, he had told his staff and players not to give any interviews. 

Having won only one of fifteen games in charge, Riga was sacked by Blackpool on 27 October 2014. He became the club's second shortest-serving manager in their history, behind Michael Appleton.

Standard Liège
On 2 February 2015, Riga returned to Standard Liège in Belgium, where he was re-appointed as manager following Ivan Vukomanović's departure. He took charge of his first game four days later, winning 3–0 against Mouscron. Towards the end of the season, he announced he would not be prolonging his contract. Slavoljub Muslin was announced as his successor on 5 June.

Return to Charlton Athletic
On 14 January 2016 Riga was appointed head coach of Charlton Athletic for the second time. His first win came away at Rotherham United in a 1-4 victory. Following the relegation he left the club and was replaced by Russell Slade.

Cercle Brugge
Riga was appointed head coach at Cercle Brugge in the Belgian First Division B on 1 November 2016 but was sacked in October 2017.

URSL Visé
On 14 October 2019, Riga was appointed sporting director of URSL Visé.

JS Kabylie
On 22 June 2022, Riga was appointed head coach of JS Kabylie. On 6 September, he was sacked.

Managerial statistics

References

1957 births
Living people
Belgian people of Spanish descent
Belgian football managers
Standard Liège managers
C.S. Visé managers
R.A.E.C. Mons managers
Charlton Athletic F.C. managers
Blackpool F.C. managers
FC Metz managers
Cercle Brugge K.S.V. managers
English Football League managers
Expatriate football managers in England
Belgian expatriates in England
Belgian expatriate football managers
Sportspeople from Liège
Belgian footballers
C.S. Visé players
Association footballers not categorized by position